Nishagandhi is a 1970 Indian Malayalam-language film, directed by A. N. Thampi. The film stars Sathyan, Jayabharathi, Adoor Bhasi and Pattom Sadan. The film had musical score by G. Devarajan.

Cast

Sathyan
Jayabharathi
Adoor Bhasi
Pattom Sadan
P. J. Antony
Sankaradi
T. R. Omana
K. P. A. C. Azeez
K. P. Ummer
Khadeeja
Kottarakkara Sreedharan Nair
Vijayakala
Vijayanirmala

Soundtrack
The music was composed by G. Devarajan and the lyrics were written by O. N. V. Kurup.

References

External links
 

1970 films
1970s Malayalam-language films